The Greatest Hits is an album by GRITS. Released on August 28, 2007, it is a double-disc album with 15 greatest hits and another 15 rare and unreleased tracks, which were later released on October 2, 2007, as a separate album titled A Second Serving.

Track listing
Disc 1
 Here We Go
 Hittin' Curves
 Ima Showem
 Open Bar
 Ooh Ahh
 They All Fall Down
 C2K
 Alcoholic Plagiarism
 We Don't Play
 Tennessee Bwoys
 High
 Tight Wit These
 What Be Goin' Down / Hopes And Dreams
 Believe
 Set Ya Mind

Disc 2
 G2G (City 2 City)
 Bad 4 Me
 Gutta Music
 Better Without Me
 Rise
 Redemption
 Beautiful
 Rainy Days
 Not The Same
 Ima Showem (Dirty South Remix)
 They All Fall Down (Remix)
 Set Sail
 Shouldna Done It
 Ooh, Ahh (Liquid Beats Remix)
 Butter My Grits (Live)

GRITS albums
2007 greatest hits albums
Gotee Records compilation albums